Peter Amory (born  Peter Walton on 2 November 1964) is an English actor best known for playing the role of Chris Tate in ITV's soap opera Emmerdale. He was born in Norwich, Norfolk.

Personal life
He was married to actress Claire King, who played his stepmother Kim Tate, but the couple separated after ten years, they are however still good friends. He has a son, Thomas, from a previous relationship. He was good friends with his former on-screen sister Leah Bracknell (Zoe Tate).

Filmography

Film

Television

References

External links

1964 births
English male television actors
Living people
Actors from Norwich
Actors from Norfolk
People associated with RADA
Alumni of RADA